Thomas Tumler  (born 5 November 1989) is a Swiss alpine skier who competes internationally.

He participated in the 2018 Winter Olympics.

World Cup Results

Podiums
 0 wins
 2 podiums – (1 GS, 1 PG)

References

External links
 

1989 births
Living people
People from Scuol
Swiss male alpine skiers
Olympic alpine skiers of Switzerland
Alpine skiers at the 2018 Winter Olympics
Sportspeople from Graubünden